The Sweet Life of Count Bobby (German: Das süsse Leben des Grafen Bobby) is a 1962 Austrian musical comedy film directed by Géza von Cziffra and starring Peter Alexander, Ingeborg Schöner and Gunther Philipp. It was the second in a trilogy of films featuring Alexander in the character of Count Bobby. It was followed by Count Bobby, The Terror of The Wild West in 1966.

It was partly shot at the Sievering Studios in Vienna. The film's sets were designed by the art director Fritz Jüptner-Jonstorff.

Plot
Count Bobby and his friend are running a struggling detective agency. However they get a break when they investigate a gang of smugglers using a nightclub as a front. In order to infiltrate the organisation Bobby is required to go undercover dresses as a woman.

Cast
 Peter Alexander as Count Robert 'Bobby' von Pinelski 
 Ingeborg Schöner as Vera Burger 
 Gunther Philipp as Baron Mucki von Kalk 
 Margitta Scherr as Babsy 
 Oskar Sima as Benvenuto Sokrates Socre 
 Rolf Olsen as Pietro Krokowitsch 
 Gerd Frickhöffer as Marchese Peperoni 
 Sieglinde Thomas as Helene 
 Fritz Muliar as Director Pullizer 
 Bill Ramsey as Johnny H. Clayton 
 Heide Alrun as Rita 
 Erna Ascher as Loni, a sex bomb
 Karl Ehmann as old waiter 
 Johannes Ferigo as doorman at the Grand Hotel
 C.W. Fernbach as conductor 
 Peter Machac as Heribert Leitner 
 Raoul Retzer as a gentleman on the train
 Krista Stadler as Gerti 
 Elisabeth Stiepl as cleaning lady at the 'Bajadere' 
 Heinrich Trimbur as Director Langberg

References

External links
 

1962 musical comedy films
Austrian musical comedy films
Films directed by Géza von Cziffra
Austrian sequel films
Cross-dressing in film
Sascha-Film films
Constantin Film films
Films shot at Sievering Studios
1960s German-language films